Setter Hill may refer to the following hills:
Setter Hill, Tingwall, on Mainland, Shetland
Setter Hill, Whalsay, on Whalsay, Shetland